Monsters vs. Aliens is a 2009 American computer-animated 3D science fiction action-comedy film.

Monsters vs. Aliens may also refer to:

 Monsters vs. Aliens (franchise), a CGI animated media franchise
 Monsters vs. Aliens (video game), a 2009 cooperative video game
 Monsters vs. Aliens (TV series), a TV series sequel to the film